Brian Edmund Lewis, 2nd Baron Essendon (7 December 1903 – 18 July 1978), also known as Bug, was a British motor-racing driver, company director, baronet, and peer.

Born in Edmonton, Middlesex, he was the only son of the first Lord Essendon, the shipping magnate, by his wife Eleanor (d. 1967), daughter of R. H. Harrison of West Hartlepool. In 1938, he married Mary Duffil, widow of Albert Duffil, daughter of G. W. Booker of Los Angeles.

Educated at Malvern, and Pembroke College, Cambridge, he was a Director of Furness Withy (the family shipping firm), Barry Aikman Travel Ltd and Godfrey Davis & Co Ltd.

He raced Frazer Nashes in England in the 1920s and entered a private Maserati 8CM at the Swiss Grand Prix 1935. As The Times put it in 1978:
'Along with a distinguished band that included Lord Howe, Sir Henry Birkin, and the Earl of March, later the Duke of Richmond, he was one of a bunch of titled and talented amateurs who did much for the image of British motor racing in the 1920s and 1930s, albeit mainly at the wheel of foreign cars.'

In 1930, along with noted pilot Charles Barnard, he founded Brian Lewis and C.D. Barnard Ltd as aircraft dealers, becoming the main UK agent for de Havilland. In 1931 the company became Brian Lewis and Company Ltd and merged with Selfridges Aviation Department, declaring itself as “The largest retailers in the world”. Based at Heston Aerodrome in Middlesex, the company expanded to Hooton Park Aerodrome, Liverpool and later to Renfrew Airport, Glasgow and Ipswich. It later moved from Heston to Elstree Aerodrome, then known as Aldenham.

In the late 1930s, he was a motoring correspondent of the News Chronicle and a President of the Guild of Motoring Writers.

Lord Essendon succeeded his father in the peerage and barony in 1944.

His main recreation was golf.  He was a member of the Bath Club in London.

He lived in London and at Avenue Eglantine 5, Lausanne, Switzerland. He died in Lausanne, Switzerland.

Racing record

Third in the 1930 24 Hours of Le Mans in a Talbot. 
Third in the 1932 24 Hours of Le Mans in a Talbot.
Third in the 1933 24 Hours of Le Mans in an Alfa Romeo.
First in the 1933 Mannin Moar in an Alfa Romeo 8C 2300 Monza.
Sixth in the 1933 Nice Grand Prix in an Alfa Romeo 8C 2300 Monza.
First in the 1934 Mannin Moar in an Alfa Romeo Tipo B.
First in the 1935 Mannin Moar in a Bugatti T59.
Did not finish the 1935 Nice Grand Prix in a Maserati 8C.
Did not finish the 1935 Swiss Grand Prix in a Maserati 8CM.
Not classified in the 1935 Donington Grand Prix in a Riley.
15th in the 1636 George Vanderbilt Cup in an ERA B-Type.
99th in the 1932 George Vanderbilt Cup in an ERA B-Type

24 Hours of Le Mans results

Complete European Championship results
(key) (Races in bold indicate pole position) (Races in italics indicate fastest lap)

Notes
 – Lewis was co-driver with Howe at the French GP and with Birkin at the Belgian GP, therefore rules excluded him from the championship.

References

The Times, 19 July 1978. Obituary, page 19.

External links
 Cricket Archive profile of Brian Lewis. www.acscricket.com. Retrieved 3 May 2010.
 Historic Racing profile of Brian Lewis. www.historicracing.com. Retrieved 3 May 2010.
 List of famous students at Pembroke College, Cambridge : Brian Lewis, 2nd Baron Essendon www.listaba.com. Retrieved 3 May 2010.
 "historicracing.com: 188 - Fitted out in a nice bespoke suit and tie here we find 'Bug' ready to tackle the outer circuit at Brooklands in 1930." www.facebook.com. Retrieved 3 May 2010.

1903 births
1978 deaths
Lewis, Brian
Alumni of Pembroke College, Cambridge
Barons in the Peerage of the United Kingdom
British businesspeople in shipping
English racing drivers
Lewis, Brian
People educated at Malvern College
British motoring journalists
European Championship drivers
20th-century British businesspeople